Timothy Gay Jr. represented Dedham, Massachusetts, in the Great and General Court.

He was also the Norfolk County jailkeeper when Jason Fairbanks escaped. He was acquitted of any wrongdoing, but was turned out of office.

References

Works cited

Members of the Massachusetts General Court
Year of birth missing
Year of death missing